Désiré Marcel Weyergans, called Franz Weyergans (27 April 1912 – 8 February 1974) was a Belgian writer and translator of French language.

Life 
Born in Ougrée, he is the father of writer François Weyergans.

He was awarded the Grand prix catholique de littérature in 1958 for Les Gens heureux and the prix Victor-Rossel in 1969 for L’Opération.

Works 
 Raisons de vivre, Paris/Brussels, Éditions les Écrits, 1945, 176 p. 
 Lettres à un jeune vivant, Paris, Éditions Pascal, 1946, 69 p. 
 La Route et la Maison, Tournai, Belgium, Casterman, 1953, 175 p. 
 Pinocchio, after Carlo Collodi, ill. by Simone Baudoin, Tournai, Belgium, Éditions Casterman, 1954, 32 p. 
 Prairies, Paris, Éditions Pascal, 1954, 356 p. 
 36 ballons, ill. by Simone Baudoin, Paris, Casterman, coll. "Farandole", 1954, 19 p. 
 Trois petits Noirs débrouillards, ill. by Simone Baudoin, Paris, Éditions Casterman, coll. "Farandole", 1954, 19 p. 
 L'Ours aimable, ill. by Robert Marsia, Paris, Casterman, coll. "Farandole", 1956, 19 p. 
 Choix de poèmes contemporains à l'usage des classes de seconde, Paris, Éditions Universitaires, 1957, 188 p. 
 Les Gens heureux, essay, Paris, Éditions Universitaires, 1957, 176 p. 
 - Grand prix catholique de littérature 1958
 Théâtre et roman contemporains, choix de textes à l'usage des classes de première, Paris, Éditions Universitaires, 1957, 272 p. 
 Le Père Pire et l’Europe du cœur, Paris, Éditions Universitaires, 1958, 216 p. 
 Le Bonheur à Venise, Paris, Éditions du Seuil, 1959, 190 p. 
 Mystiques parmi nous, Paris, Fayard, 1959, 127 p. 
 L’Amour fidèle, Paris, Éditions Universitaires, 1960, 215 p. 
 La Bibliothèque idéale des jeunes, Paris, Éditions Universitaires, 1960, 336 p. 
 Apprendre à lire, Paris, Éditions Universitaires, 1961, 202 p. 
 Saint François d'Assise…, Tours, France, Alfred Mame et Fils, coll. "Votre nom, votre saint", 1962, 108 p. 
 Enfants de ma patience, Paris, Éditions Universitaires, 1964, 167 p. 
 Vie du docteur Tom Dooley…, ill. by Robert Marsia, Paris, Éditions Casterman, 1967, 174 p. 
 Mon amour dans l'île, Paris, Éditions Universitaires, 1968, 183 p. 
 L’Opération, Paris, Éditions Julliard, 1968, 319 p. 
 -  Prix Victor-Rossel 1969
 On dira cet hiver, Paris, Éditions Julliard, 1970, 255 p. 
 Béguinages de Belgique, with Anne Zenoni, phot. by Michel Fischer, Brussels, Belgium, Éditions Paul Legrain, 1972, 190 p.  
 La Grand-Place de Bruxelles, phot. by Michel Fischer, Brussels, Belgium, Éditions Paul Legrain, 1974, 182 p.

References

External links 
 François Weyergans, Franz et François on Université de liège

1912 births
1974 deaths
People from Seraing
20th-century Belgian male writers
Belgian male novelists
Roman Catholic writers